The booby is a type of seabird.

Booby or boobies may also refer to:

Slang
 Breast

Places
 Booby Island (Queensland), Queensland, Australia
 Booby Island (Kimberley), Western Australia
 Booby Island, a mile offshore of (but not officially claimed by) Saint George Basseterre Parish
 Booby Cay, one of the three Swan Islands, Honduras
 Booby Pond, Cayman Islands - see Booby Pond Nature Reserve

As a nickname
Boobie Clark (1949–1988), American National Football League player
Russell Clark (criminal) (1898–1968), American thief, bank robber and prison escapee nicknamed "Boobie"
Anthony Dixon (born 1987), American National Football League player nicknamed "Boobie"
Daniel Gibson (born 1986), American National Basketball Association player nicknamed "Booby" or "Boobie"
Boobie Miles (born 1970), American high school football player

Other uses
Sir Thomas Booby and Lady Booby, characters in the novel Joseph Andrews

See also
Booby's Bay, Cornwall, UK
Booby trap, a device intended to harm a person who triggers it
Boob (disambiguation)
Bubi (disambiguation)
Bobby (disambiguation)

Lists of people by nickname

ja:ブービー
simple:Booby